Kfarhata or Kfar Hata may refer to:
Kfarhata, a Lebanese village located in the Koura District in the North Governorate
Kfarhata Zgharta, a Lebanese village located in the Zgharta District in the North Governorate
Kfar Hitta, a Lebanese village located in the Byblos District in the Mount Lebanon Governorate
Kfar Hatta, a Lebanese village located in the Sidon District of the South Governorate